The Bidhan Chandra Roy Award was instituted in 1962 in memory of Dr. B. C. Roy by the Medical Council of India. It is presented by the President of India in New Delhi every year on July 1,  National Doctors' Day. It is also the highest honour that can be achieved by a doctor in India.

The Award is given annually in each of the following categories: Statesmanship of the Highest Order in India, Medical man-cum-Statesman, Eminent Medical Person, Eminent person in Philosophy, Eminent person in Science and Eminent person in Arts.

It was first awarded in 1973 to Sandip Mukerjee, FRCS, of Willingdon Hospital (now Ram Manohar Lohia Hospital), New Delhi, by V. V. Giri, the then President of India.

Recipients

1970s
 Sandip Mukharji (1973)
 Nagarur Gopinath (1978)
 P. S. R. K. Haranath (1979)
 Vikram Marwah (1979)

1980s
 M.N. Ghosh (1980)
Sri J G Jolly (1981)
 S. P. Gupta M.D., FAMS (1983)
 Om Dutt Gulati (1981)
 M. M. S. Ahuja (1982)
 Perugu Siva Reddy (1982)
 Sri Prabhu Dayal Nigam (1983)
 Prem Nath Wahi (1984)
Jagjit Singh Chopra (1986)
 Atluri Sriman Narayana (1989)
 Dinesh K. Bhargava (1989)

1993
 Kirpal Singh Chugh
Pinnamaneni Narasimharao, Vijayawada, A.P

1994
 M.L. Kulkarni, Pediatrician and Geneticist
 V. S. Natarajan - Geriatric physician
 Daljit Singh, Ophthalmologist

1995

 Prof. P.V. Chalapathi Rao, General Surgeon 
 Sivapatham Vittal, Surgical endocrinologist

1996
 Wilfred de Souza
 Mathew Samuel Kalarickal

1997 
 G. B. Parulkar

1998
 Arjunan Rajasekaran, Urologist and Padma Shri recipient
 Shashanka Mohan Bose , General Surgeon, Chandigarh

1999
Belle Monappa Hegde
K.A. Ashok Pai 
Upendra Kaul
B C Das 
Farooq Abdullah
Dr. Shivadeo S. Bapat, Urologist, Pune

2000
 S.Arulrhaj - Tuticorin, Tamil Nadu, India.
 Manju Gita Mishra, Patna, Bihar, India.
 Shashanka Mohan Bose, General Surgeon , Chandigarh

2001
I. Sathyamurthy
MayilVahanan Natarajan
S. K. Sama

2002
 Nilima Arun Kshirsagar 
 V. V. Radhakrishnan, S. P. Agarwal, C. P. Thakur, S. K. Sharma, G. Venkataswamy, Govind Swarup, Gourie Devi, T. R. Anantharaman, and Obaid Siddiqi
 K. K. Talwar, Mukkai Kesavan Lalitha, Jai Dev Wig, Rakesh Tandon and C. V. Bhirmanandham
 Abraham G. Thomas, Ashok Panagariya, and Saroj Chooramani Gopal
 Sanjiv Malik and A. K. Kesanna
 N. K. Venkataramana
 Narayana Panicker Kochupillai
 Laxmi Chand Gupta

2003 - 2004
 Purshotam Lal
 Vinay Kumar Kapoor
 V. K. Puri
 M. C. Pant
 Shally Awasthi
 T. V. Devarajan
 Sunil Pradhan

2005 - 2013
 Amrinder Jit Kanwar
  V. Mohan, Naresh Trehan, K. K. Aggarwal, Ajay Kumar, Anoop Misra and Lalit Kumar, S. M. Balaji, N. K. Pandey
 Yogesh Kumar Chawla, Rayapu Ramesh Babu, P. K. Bilwani and Prakash B. Behere
 Amit Banerjee
 P. Varalakshmi, R. K. Dhiman and S. R. Mittal
 Anupam Sachdeva, Alka Kriplani, A. K. Mahapatra, Drupad Nautamlal Chhatrapati, and  Ganesh Gopalakrishnan
 Nikhil C. Munshi, 
  Tejas Patel
 Nikhil Tandon
 Kodaganur S. Gopinath
 Dr. H. Sudarshan Ballal (2010), Nephrologist, Director & Chairman of Manipal Hospitals Group
 Milind Vasant Kirtane
 Mahesh Verma
 Kumar L Pradhan [ 47 ] Eminent personality & Senior Scientist in field of Sericulture & recipient of numerous awards and also awarded honorary doctorate by Government of India
 Sanjeev Bagai
 Gurpreet Singh Wander
 C. V. Harinarayan,- Sakra World Hospital 
 Moti Lal Singh M.S. FRCS (London) FRCS (Edin) - Patna

2014  

Eminent Medical Person:
 Anand B. R., Former Chief Medical Officer, Indian Railways, Mysore. 
 Arvind Kumar, Sir Ganga Ram Hospital, New Delhi; 
 Randeep Guleria, AIIMS, New Delhi.

Eminent Medical Teacher: 
 Ravi Kant, Lucknow
 Ashwani Kumar, New Delhi
 Rajesh Malhotra, New Delhi
 Rakesh Yadav, New Delhi
 P.V.L.N. Murthy, Hyderabad.
 
Best talents in encouraging the development of specialities in different branches in Medicine:
 Janak Desai, Ahmedabad
 Rajesh Upadhyay, New Delhi
 Binay Karak, Patna
 Ashok Rajgopal, Gurgaon
 Davinder Singh Rana, New Delhi.
 
Outstanding services in the field of Sociomedical Relief:
 Rama Reddy Karri, Rajamahendravaram (AP);  
 Jitender B Patel, Ahmedabad; 
 Sudipto Roy, Kolkata.

2015  

Eminent Medical Person:
 C. Palanivelu, GEM Institute for Gastrointestinal Disease, Coimbatore; 
 Ashok Seth, Fortis Escorts Heart Institute & Research Center, New Delhi.

Eminent Medical Teacher:
 N Sanjeeva Reddy, Chennai; 
 CS Yadav, New Delhi; 
 AK Bisoi, New Delhi; 
 DJ Borah, Guwahati; 
 Arun Thakur, Patna.
 
Best talents in encouraging the development of specialities in different branches in Medicine:
 HP Bhalodiya, Ahmedabad; 
 Parimal M Desai, Ahmedabad;
 Anand Khakhar, Chennai; 
 Ambrish Mittal, New Delhi; 
 Amlesh Seth, New Delhi.
 
Outstanding service in the field of Socio Medical Relief:
 A Marthanda Pillai, Thiruvananthapuram; 
 John Ebnezar, Bangalore; 
 A Arulvisagan, Puducherry.
Aid or Assistance to Research Project:
 JB Sharma, New Delhi.

2016 

Eminent Medical Person:
 Vipul R. Patel

Eminent Person - Literature:
 Anil Kumar Chaturvedi

Eminent Medical Teacher:
 Prem Nath Dogra
 M. Unnikrishnan
 G. S. Umamaheshwara Rao
 Ved Prakash Mishra
 Rajeshwar Dayal

Best Talents in Encouraging the Development of Specialties in Different Branches in Medicines:
 Sanjay Balwant Kulkarni
 O. P. Yadava
 Pawanindra Lal
 D. Raghunadharao
 Pradeep Tandon
 Dr.G.venugopala rao

Outstanding Service in the field of Socio Medical Relief:
 T Rajagopal
 Satchit Balsari
 S. Geethalakshmi - Tamil Nadu Dr. M.G.R. Medical University - Vice Chancellor
 Devraj Rai
 Pallarisetti Raghu Ram
 Karri Rama Reddy (Rajahmundry), award received in the year 2017 for Service of Socio Medical Relief for the year 2014.

Aid or Assistance to Research Project:
 Punit Gupta

2017 
Prof. M.L.B. Bhatt, Vice Chancellor, K. G. Medical university, Lucknow under the category of Eminent Medical Teacher.  
Syed Sanaullah Mohd Tabish, AIIMS, New Delhi
Avinash Supe, Seth GSMC, Mumbai (Teaching Category) 
Dr.Rashmi Kaur, PGI, Chandigarh
Dr.Amit Singh, Bihar
Dr.Farheen Zuber Patel, Gujarat
Dr.Kanu Bhatia, Mumbai
Dr.S.P. Bhatt, Surat
Dr.Suman Prasad, AIIMS, New Delhi
Dr.Satchit Balsari, Boston

2018 

Eminent Medical Person:
 H. S. Shashidhar (Medical Director, Manasa group of hospitals Karnataka)
 B. K. Misra - Chairman of Neurosurgery, Hinduja Hospitals

Outstanding service in the field of socio medical relief

 P Raghu. Ram
 H. R. Surendra, MBBS, MS (ophthalmology), WHO fellow, General Secretary of International Friends of Buddhists
 Kirit Premjibhai Solanki, MBBS , MS (General Surgery), FICS. Ex Professor of Surgery V S Hospital Ahmedabad (He is currently 2nd term Member of Parliament from Ahmedabad West constituency Gujarat)

Best talents in encouraging the development of specialties in different branches in Medicine
 Sanjay Desai

See also

 List of medicine awards

References

External links
 B. C. Roy Award Details

Indian awards
Medical Council of India
Medicine awards